Interstate 195 (I-195) is an auxiliary route of the Interstate Highway System located in the US state of New Jersey. Its western end is at I-295 and Route 29 just south of Trenton in Hamilton Township, Mercer County, while its eastern end is at the Garden State Parkway, Route 34, and Route 138 in Wall Township, Monmouth County. The route is mostly a four-lane highway that mainly runs through agrarian and wooded areas in Central Jersey. It has an interchange with the New Jersey Turnpike (I-95) in Robbinsville Township and serves as a main access road to New Jersey's state capital of Trenton, the Horse Park of New Jersey, the Six Flags Great Adventure amusement park, and the Jersey Shore. I-195 is occasionally referred to as the Central Jersey Expressway. On April 6, 1988, President Ronald Reagan signed H.R. 4263 naming I-195 in New Jersey the James J. Howard Interstate Highway, in honor of the late James J. Howard.

The current I-195 was initially planned as a toll road called the Trenton–Asbury Park Expressway in the 1950s. In the 1960s, it became two proposed freeways Route 37 and Route 38 that were to cross the central part of the state. A compromise was reached for a single freeway between Trenton and Belmar which would get Interstate Highway funding as I-195. It was built in several stages during the 1970s and 1980s. There once existed a plan to extend the I-195 designation west to the interchange between the Pennsylvania Turnpike (I-276) and I-95 in Bristol Township, Pennsylvania, but it was decided to extend the I-295 designation west and south, along existing I-95 instead.

Route description
I-195's western terminus is at a modified cloverleaf interchange with I-295 in Hamilton Township, Mercer County, located southeast of the city of Trenton. From this end, the freeway continues north into Trenton as Route 29. I-195 serves as the southern continuation of Route 29, continuing east from I-295 as a six-lane expressway, passing between suburban neighborhoods to the north and Crosswicks Creek to the south. After the exit for U.S. Route 206 (US 206), the highway narrows to four lanes and turns northeast as it interchanges with County Route 524 (CR 524) and CR 620. Following this, I-195 passes near more neighborhoods and runs to the northwest of Gropp Lake before turning more to the east. The route has a cloverleaf interchange with Yardville-Hamilton Square Road before passing near business parks and reaching a cloverleaf junction with US 130. After US 130, the road enters Robbinsville Township as the settings start to become more rural, with a few areas of suburban development. In Robbinsville Township, there is a ramp that provides access to the New Jersey Turnpike (I-95). Shortly after passing over the New Jersey Turnpike, I-195 reaches the exit for CR 526. The highway runs to the north of Allentown before briefly forming the border between Robbinsville Township to the north and Upper Freehold Township, Monmouth County, to the south as it reaches the interchange with CR 524/CR 539.

Upon passing under CR 524/CR 539, I-195 fully enters Upper Freehold Township in Monmouth County and continues east through a mix of woodland and farmland. The next interchange the highway reaches is with CR 43. Past this exit, the highway passes through more rural areas and crosses into Millstone Township. In this area, I-195 turns to the southeast and enters more forested areas as it comes to a cloverleaf interchange with CR 537. This exit off I-195 provides access to the Six Flags Great Adventure amusement park and the Jackson Premium Outlets. Due to the presence of Six Flags, this exit off I-195 can become busy during the summer months since it provides access to the park from both the New Jersey Turnpike and the Garden State Parkway, which lies just east of I-195's eastern terminus. Upon crossing CR 537, the highway enters Jackson Township in Ocean County and continues east through heavy woods. The road comes to an exit with CR 527, where there is a park-and-ride lot for motorists. The median of I-195 widens past the CR 527 junction before narrowing as it comes to the CR 638 interchange. The road runs through more woodland, with nearby residential development increasing.

After crossing the North Branch Metedeconk River, I-195 continues into Howell Township, Monmouth County, and turns northeast, reaching a cloverleaf interchange with US 9. At this point, the road turns east again and soon heads back into dense woods, passing over the Southern Secondary railroad line operated by the Delaware and Raritan River Railroad. After crossing the Manasquan River, the expressway interchanges with CR 547, which provides access to CR 524 and CR 549. Shortly after CR 547, I-195 enters Wall Township and passes through Allaire State Park. The eastern end of I-195 is located at exit 35, its junction with Route 34 that has access to the southbound Garden State Parkway from the eastbound direction. At the exit for Route 34, I-195 ends and Route 138 begins, but the highway and exit numbering continue onto Route 138, marking the interchange with the Garden State Parkway as exit 36. Past this interchange, Route 138 continues east to Belmar on the Jersey Shore as an arterial boulevard, making connections with Route 18 and Route 35.

History

What would become I-195 was first proposed in the late 1950s as a toll road called the Trenton–Asbury Park Expressway that was to be operated by the New Jersey Highway Authority, the owner of the Garden State Parkway at the time. In 1965, this road would be incorporated into a planned Central Jersey Expressway System. The western portion would become a part of the Route 37 freeway that was to run from Trenton to Seaside Heights while the eastern portion would become a part of the Route 38 freeway that was to run from Camden to Belmar. The two freeways were to meet near Fort Dix. By 1967, plans for the Route 38 freeway were canceled, leaving Route 37 as the only planned east–west freeway through central New Jersey. The routing of this freeway, which was to be called the Central Jersey Expressway, was changed to run from the Trenton area east to Wall Township In addition, officials pushed for Interstate Highway funding for the freeway, with funds to be diverted from the canceled I-278 in Union County. The proposed freeway would cost $60 million (equivalent to $ in ).

By 1970, construction took place on the route between CR 539 near Allentown and CR 527 in Jackson Township. The portion of I-195 between the New Jersey Turnpike and CR 527 was opened by 1973 and construction on the section between White Horse and the New Jersey Turnpike began. In 1979, I-195 was completed east to Squankum. By 1983, the length of I-195 was completed.

When it was planned, I-195 did not intersect I-95 at all; it instead connected to I-295 at its west end. When I-95 was rerouted to the New Jersey Turnpike after the cancelation of the Somerset Freeway, I-195 was connected to I-95. Previously, I-95 abruptly ended at I-295 and US 1 in Lawrence Township and motorists had to take I-295 southbound to I-195 east in order to access I-95/New Jersey Turnpike.  This is no longer necessary as a result of the Pennsylvania Turnpike/Interstate 95 Interchange Project which opened to traffic on September 22, 2018 completing the full length of I-95 from Miami, Florida, to Houlton, Maine.

On April 6, 1988, President Ronald Reagan signed H.R. 4263 naming I-195 in New Jersey the James J. Howard Interstate Highway, in honor of the late James J. Howard, a US Representative from New Jersey who advocated improving the highways of the US. In the late 1990s, the New Jersey Department of Transportation (NJDOT) considered the possibility of widening I-195 to six lanes between the New Jersey Turnpike and CR 537 in order to accommodate traffic going to Six Flags Great Adventure. In 1997, separate ramps were added from I-195 to westbound and eastbound CR 537, and the westbound ramp was expanded to two lanes for Six Flags traffic.

I-195, like many other highways in New Jersey, once had solar-powered emergency callboxes every . With the advent of cellphones, the callboxes saw limited use. To save on maintenance costs, NJDOT removed the callboxes in 2005.

On April 30, 2010, NJDOT started a project to repave the expressway both eastbound and westbound from just east of the turnpike overpasses near exit 7 in Robbinsville Township to exit 11 in Upper Freehold Township. This was completed in late 2010.

From July 2009 until November 2014, the New Jersey Turnpike (I-95) was widened with the construction of new outer roadways ("truck lanes") that extended the "dual-dual" roadways south to Interchange 6 in Mansfield Township from its former end at Interchange 8A in Monroe Township. As part of this project, the overpasses carrying I-195 over the turnpike were reconstructed, the Interchange 7A toll gate was widened, and all the ramps connecting directly to the mainline of the turnpike were rebuilt which included building a new high-speed ramp over I-195 to enter the northbound lanes of the turnpike.

For about a decade, there was a plan to extend the designation of I-195 to the west in concurrence with the rerouting of I-95 planned as part of the Pennsylvania Turnpike/Interstate 95 Interchange Project. Beginning in 2005, plans were made to extend I-195 west from its present-day western terminus along I-295 and I-95, continuing counterclockwise to the north, west, and south around Trenton to the new interchange. I-295 would have been truncated to the current interchange with I-195. Officials from New Jersey and Pennsylvania had agreed to submit the I-195 request to American Association of State Highway and Transportation Officials (AASHTO), as no route designation is official until approved by them. Had it been approved, approximately  would have been added to I-195. Interchange renumbering would have also taken place in concert with the future I-195 designation in Pennsylvania and both the planned and current I-195 designation in New Jersey. This proposal had received conditional approval from AASHTO. However, on May 20, 2015, the original plan of extending I-295 west and south into Pennsylvania to the new interchange was approved instead, leaving the western terminus of I-195 at its current location.

In 2018, the exit numbers at the interchanges for I-295 (exits 60A–B) and US 206 (exits 1A–B) were renumbered to exits 1A–B and exits 1C–D, respectively. This change was done as part of the I-95/I-295 redesignation project to match the milemarkers along I-195.

Future
NJDOT has studied proposals to widen I-195 between CR 537 and the New Jersey Turnpike from four to six total lanes, eliminating the grass median in the process.

Exit list

See also

References

External links

 Interstate 195 (Steve Anderson)
 New Jersey Roads: Interstate 195
 Speed Limits for State Roads: Interstate 195 in New Jersey

95-1
Transportation in Mercer County, New Jersey
Transportation in Monmouth County, New Jersey
Transportation in Ocean County, New Jersey
95-1 New Jersey
1 New Jersey